Douglas Tallamy is an American entomologist, ecologist and conservationist. He is a professor in the Department of Entomology and Wildlife Ecology at the University of Delaware. He has written and co-authored several books, as well as many papers.

Tallamy advocates for home gardens and landscaping that bridge the gaps between parks and preserves in providing habitat for native species. He has spoken on the connections between plants and insects and how those relations are important to birds. He has called for smaller lawns. He was interviewed about the need to plant more native plants by Utah Public Radio.

Tallamy has overseen rigorous field-studies that examine native versus introduced flora as caterpillar hosts and chickadee habitat.

Bibliography
 (2007)
 (2016)
 (2020)
 (2021)

References

Further reading

 "Meet the Ecologist Who Wants You to Unleash the Wild on Your Backyard" - in-depth profile in Smithsonian Magazine (April 2020)

External links

American entomologists
American ecologists
American conservationists
Conservation biologists
American non-fiction environmental writers
21st-century American non-fiction writers
University of Delaware faculty
Living people
Year of birth missing (living people)
Place of birth missing (living people)